Libre (Free) is the first album recorded by pop singer and present member of the quartet Il Divo, Sébastien Izambard. It was released on October 13, 2000. The album contains eleven pop songs in French.

Track listing

See also
 Le Petit Prince

References

External links
 Official website Sébastien Izambard
 Official website Il Divo

Sébastien Izambard albums
2000 debut albums